Odo Richard Vivian, 3rd Baron Swansea MVO DSO TD (22 April 1875 – 16 November 1934) was a Welsh Lieutenant Colonel from the Vivian family.

Biography
Vivian, the son of Colonel Henry Vivian, 1st Baron Swansea, and Averil Beaumont, was born at Eaton Square, London.

In 1893, at the age of 18, he became a student at the University of Cambridge. He was awarded the Royal Victorian Order (Fourth Class) by King Edward, at Swansea, in July 1902

He served in World War I with the Royal Irish Rifles and the Cameron Highlanders. He was Lieutenant Colonel of 6th Battalion, Welch Regiment, Glamorgan Yeomanry, and was made a Companion of the Distinguished Service Order for gallantry during the war. He was awarded a Territorial Decoration in 1916. A diary by Vivian, kept during his service in the war, and including his account of the 1917 Battle of Ypres, is held by the National Library of Wales.

He later served as a Justice of the Peace and was Deputy Lieutenant of Glamorgan. In 1922 he gained the title of 3rd Baron Swansea on the death of his half brother, Ernest Vivian, 2nd Baron Swansea.

His uncle Sir Arthur Vivian was a Liberal politician.

He died at his country seat, Caer Beris at Builth Wells in Breconshire, on 16 November 1934.

Marriage and children
He married the Hon. Winifred Hamilton, daughter of Ion Hamilton, 1st Baron HolmPatrick, and Lady Victoria Wellesley, on 25 October 1906. Their children were:
Hon. Ursula Margaret Vivian, b. 13 May 1910, d. 2 August 1963
John Hamilton Hussey Vivian, 4th Baron Swansea, b. 1 January 1925, d. 24 June 2005
Hon. Rosemary Winifred Vivian, b. 4 June 1927, d. 1981
Averil Vivian, b. 8 January 1930

References

Further reading

External links 
Odo Richard Vivian, 3rd Baron Swansea at npg.org.uk
"The Children of Sir H Hussey Vivian, Bt. M.P." by George Elgar Hicks at sothebys.com

Swansea, Odo Richard Vivian, 3rd Baron
Swansea, Odo Richard Vivian, 3rd Baron
Barons in the Peerage of the United Kingdom
Odo Richard Vivian, 3rd Baron
Glamorgan Yeomanry officers
Welsh justices of the peace
People from Belgravia